Narpus is a genus of riffle beetles in the family Elmidae. There are at least 3 described species in Narpus.

Species
 Narpus angustus Casey, 1893
 Narpus arizonicus (Brown, 1930)
 Narpus concolor (Leconte, 1881)

References

 Brown, Harley P. (1983). "A catalog of the Coleoptera of America North of Mexico, Family: Elmidae". United States Department of Agriculture, Agriculture Handbook, no. 529-50, x + 23 + i.
 Casey, Thos. L. (1893). "Coleopterological notices, pt. 5". Annals of the New York Academy of Sciences, vol. 7, no. 6-12, 281–607.
 LeSage, L. / Bousquet, Y. (1991). "Family Elmidae - riffle beetles". Checklist of beetles of Canada and Alaska, 172–173.

Further reading

 NCBI Taxonomy Browser, Narpus
 Arnett, R. H. Jr., M. C. Thomas, P. E. Skelley and J. H. Frank. (eds.). (21 June 2002). American Beetles, Volume II: Polyphaga: Scarabaeoidea through Curculionoidea. CRC Press LLC, Boca Raton, Florida .
 
 Richard E. White. (1983). Peterson Field Guides: Beetles. Houghton Mifflin Company.

Elmidae